Harry Meyer Rubin (born December 21, 1952) is a video game, entertainment, and energy industry executive. He is a founding partner of the firm commonly known as Samuel Adams beer.

Personal history
Rubin was born in Kings Point, NY. He graduated from Stanford University (Phi Beta Kappa) and Harvard University in 1976.

He is the Chairman of Henmead Enterprises, Inc. and formerly a director of Synthesis Energy Systems Inc. 

In 1991, Rubin and his wife, a former marketing director at Columbia Pictures, co-created the board game, "Let's Buy Hollywood". Published by Rubin's firm, Henmead Enterprises, the game is similar in structure to Monopoly, players had to build a vertically integrated entertainment empire, incorporating all aspects of the industry, from talent acquisition, to film production and ultimately, distribution.

Beer
In 1984, Rubin became a founding partner of Boston Beer Company, known by its brand name of Samuel Adams, along with Lorenzo Lamadrid and Jim Koch.

Computer software and media industries
Rubin began his career in the media industry with RCA, which owned television network, NBC. At RCA, Rubin served as Vice President of Strategic Planning and Video Coordination. In 1996, he became Head of Business Affairs, Cable TV, and Home Video for General Electric following GE's acquisition of NBC.

In 1994, Rubin became Chief Financial Officer of GT Interactive and later Executive Vice President and General Manager of International Division and Business Affairs for the company. In 1998, he became President of GT Interactive's International Division.

In 1993, GT Interactive published Doom, the bestselling video game of the 1990s. The firm's revenue increased 880% and reached $101 million in its second year of existence, with profits reaching $18 million. GT Interactive's partnership with id Software produced Doom II: Hell on Earth, which was released in October and sold over 2 million copies. In December of 1995, GT Interactive Software debuted on the NASDAQ stock exchange under the stock symbol GTIS. Raising $140 million with its initial public offering, it was one of the biggest IPOs of the year, second only to Netscape's. In 1995, GT Interactive offered 10 million shares to the public at $14 each. In 1999, the firm replaced its CEO, Ron Chaimowitz, as a result of financial setbacks, and was purchased by Infogrames. In February, in light of the bad results, CEO Ron Chaimowitz was replaced. During his time at Infogrames, Rubin was appointed Senior Executive Vice President and Chief Operating Officer.

Clean coal
In 2006, Rubin was named director of Synthesis Energy Systems, Inc. ("SES") Currently, he is chairman of SES's Nominating and Governance Committee, as well as, a member of the Audit and Compensation committees. Lorenzo Lamadrid serves as chairman of the company. SES is a microcap alternative energy company that provides technology, equipment and engineering services for the conversion of low rank, low cost coal and biomass feedstocks into energy and chemical products through their proprietary U-GAS fluidized bed gasification technology. On January 5, SES announced that it had regained compliance with NASDAQ's $1.00 minimum bid rules. These rules establish minimum standards for securities to trade on the NASDAQ.

References

External links
 Forbes.com
 http://www.thefreelibrary.com/Synthesis+Energy+Systems%2c+Inc.+Appoints+Harry+M.+Rubin+to+Board+of...-a0150977096
 https://web.archive.org/web/20121011183545/http://www.faqs.org/sec-filings/100203/SYNTHESIS-ENERGY-SYSTEMS-INC_8-K/c95599exv99w1.htm
 http://www.nasdaq.com/article/boston-beer-inc-sam-new-analyst-report-from-zacks-equity-research-zacks-equity-research-report-cm379309

Living people
1952 births
Harvard Business School alumni
Stanford University alumni